Ashadtalya is a census town in Nandigram II CD block in Haldia subdivision of Purba Medinipur district in the state of West Bengal, India.

Geography

Location

Demographics
As per 2011 Census of India Asadtalya had a total population of 5,274 of which 2,722 (52%) were males and 2,552 (48%) were females. Population below 6 years was 653. The total number of literates in Asadtalya was 4,148 (89.76% of the population over 6 years).

Infrastructure
As per the District Census Handbook 2011, Ashadtalya covered an area of 2.8571 km2. Amongst the civic amenities it had 458 domestic electric connections. Amongst the educational facilities it had were 3 primary schools, 2 secondary schools and a senior secondary school. The nearest degree college was at Nandigram 5 km away.

References

Cities and towns in Purba Medinipur district